L. amseli may refer to:

 Laciempista amseli, a snout moth
 Loxomorpha amseli, a grass moth